Chongzhou, known as Chongqing County until 1994, is a county-level city of Sichuan Province, Southwest China, it is under the administration of the prefecture-level city of Chengdu, located about  west-southwest of downtown Chengdu. The first Catholic synod in China was held in this city in 1803, convened by Louis Gabriel Taurin Dufresse.

Overview

Chongzhou is accessible by road from central Chengdu via the -long S8 Chengdu–Wenjiang–Qionglai Expressway, just outside the Chengdu greater ring road. The largest sports venue by capacity in the city is the 22,000-capacity Chongzhou Sports Centre Stadium. It is used mostly for football matches.

Climate

References

County-level cities in Sichuan
Geography of Chengdu